Smith Street Motorway (SR10) (or the Smith Street extension) is a motorway grade extension of Smith Street. It connects Southport, the Gold Coast's CBD to the Pacific Motorway.

It then runs as a divided road until High Street in Southport, where it becomes North Street until the Gold Coast Highway. The motorway passes by the city's Health and Knowledge precinct, home to Griffith University, Gold Coast University Hospital and Gold Coast Private Hospital.

A new iconic red bridge for pedestrians across Smith Street was completed in early 2007. The red bridge joins the existing parklands campus of Griffith University to the new site on the southern side of Smith Street.

The highest point of the highway is 45 metres at the Smith Street interchange near the Pacific motorway.

Interchanges and intersections 
The entire motorway is in the City of Gold Coast local government area.

See also

 Freeways in Australia
 Freeways in Gold Coast

References

External links 
 Smith Street major upgrade and 24-hour T3 transit lanes

Roads on the Gold Coast, Queensland